Michael Preston Hann (born 24 August 1937) is a former British tennis player who won the Wimbledon Boys' singles title in 1955.

Tennis career
In 1955 Hann won the Wimbledon Boys' Singles title when he beat Jan-Erik Lundqvist in the final.

Hann competed on the amateur circuit during the 1950s and 60s and won 12 titles, all in the United Kingdom. In June 1953, two months before his 16th birthday, Hann won the Chapel Allerton Gentleman’s Singles Championships in Leeds. He also won this Championship in 1954 and 1956.

Hann participated at the Wimbledon Championships, in the singles and/or doubles, for a period of 13 years from 1955 to 1967. His best results were to reach the third round in the singles on three occasions and the fourth round in doubles once, in 1963 when he and his partner, Roger Taylor lost to Gordon Forbes and Abe Segal.

Junior Grand Slam titles

Singles: 1

References

External links
 

1937 births
Living people
British male tennis players
Wimbledon junior champions
Grand Slam (tennis) champions in boys' singles
Sportspeople from Sheffield
English male tennis players
Tennis people from South Yorkshire